Wang Mingjuan (born October 11, 1985 in Yongzhou, Hunan) is a Chinese weightlifter, Olympic champion, and four time world champion.

Career
She competed at the 2012 Summer Olympics in the Women's 48 kg division, winning the gold medal.

Over the course of her career she set 12 senior world records.

Major results

See also 
China at the 2012 Summer Olympics

References

1985 births
Living people
Chinese female weightlifters
Olympic gold medalists for China
Olympic medalists in weightlifting
Olympic weightlifters of China
People from Yongzhou
Weightlifters at the 2012 Summer Olympics
Weightlifters from Hunan
Asian Games medalists in weightlifting
Weightlifters at the 2006 Asian Games
Weightlifters at the 2010 Asian Games
Medalists at the 2012 Summer Olympics
Asian Games gold medalists for China

Medalists at the 2006 Asian Games
Medalists at the 2010 Asian Games
World Weightlifting Championships medalists
20th-century Chinese women
21st-century Chinese women